Penelope Aubin (c. 1679 – 1738?) was an English novelist, poet, and translator.  She published seven novels between 1721 and 1728. Aubin published poetry in 1707 and turned to novels in 1721; she translated French works in the 1720s, spoke publicly on moral and political issues at her Lady's Oratory in 1729, and wrote a play in 1730. Aubin died in April 1738, survived by her husband until his death in April 1740. After the author's death, her works were gathered and published as A Collection of Entertaining Histories and Novels, Designed to Promote the Cause of Virtue and Honor. Aubin's works have a long history after her death, being both plagiarised and published transatlantically. She is one of a number of eighteenth-century women writers whose works and biography is being more rigorously explored by modern scholars.

Early life
Penelope Aubin née Charleton's exact birth date remains unknown; she was the illegitimate daughter of Sir Richard Temple of Stowe and most likely born in London around 1679. While scholars in the past had theorized from the 'evidence' of her novels that she was both Catholic and Huguenot, more recently her biographers, Debbie Welham and Joel H. Baer, have identified that her husband's family were from Jersey in the Channel Islands with Huguenot links, her Charleton roots were English and staunchly Anglican. She was the daughter of Sir Richard Temple and Anne Charleton. Her mother Anne was the daughter of the physician and natural philosopher Walter Charleton. Aubin married her husband, Abraham Aubin, without the permission of either set of parents in 1696, and they had three children: Marie, Abraham, and Penelope, none outlived their parents. Aubin managed the family business while her husband, a merchant, fought in Queen Anne's wars (he gives a description of his military career in Aubin's obituary in 1738). Aubin was asked to be involved with a scheme by former pirate John Breholt to raise a petition in support of the repatriation of the pirates of Madagascar (and their wealth) to England; she declined to do so and her 1709 testimony to the Board of Trade enquiry regarding Breholt's character helped discredit Breholt's plans.

Works

 The Stuarts : A Pindarique Ode (1707)
 The Extasy: A Pindarick Ode to Her Majesty The Queen (1708)
  The Wellcome : A Poem to his Grace the Duke of Marlborough (1708)
 The Strange Adventures of the Count de Vinevil and His Family (1721)
 The Life of Madam de Beaumount, a French Lady (1721)
 The Life and Amorous Adventures of Lucinda (1721)
 The Doctrine of Morality (1721). Translation by T.M. Gibbs of M. De Gomberville. Republished in 1726 as Moral Virtue Delineated.
 The Noble Slaves: Or the Lives and Adventures of Two Lords and Two Ladies (1722)
 The Adventures of the Prince of Clermont, and Madam De Ravezan (1722). Translation of Mme Gillot De Beaucour.
Anne de Sola has edited a modern (2003) critical edition: 
 History of Genghizcan the Great (1722). Translation of M. François Pétis de la Croix.
 The Life of Charlotta Du Pont, an English lady; taken from her own memoirs (1723). Online edition at www.chawton.org and PDF
 The Life and Adventures of the Lady Lucy (1726)
 The Illustrious French Lovers (1726). Translation of Les Illustres Françaises by Robert Challe
 Anna de Sola has edited a modern (2000) critical edition: 
 The Life and Adventures of The Young Count Albertus, The Son of Count Lewis Augustus, by the Lady Lucy (1728)
 The Life of the Countess de Gondez (1729). Translation.
 The Merry Masqueraders; or The Humorous Cuckold (1732)
 A Collection of Entertaining Histories and Novels, Designed to Promote the Cause of Virtue and Honor (1739)
 The Inhuman Stepmother, or the History of Miss Harriot Montague (1770 edition available as a PDF from Chawton House)

Further reading
 Eve Tavor Bannet, Transatlantic Stories and the History of Reading, 1720-1810: Migrant Fictions. Cambridge: Cambridge University Press, 2011, Ch. 2.
 David Brewer and Angus Whitehead, "The Books of Lydia Languish's Circulating Library Revisited," Notes and Queries 57.4 (2010): 551–53.
 Joel Baer, "Penelope Aubin and the Pirates of Madagascar: Biographical Notes and Documents," Eighteenth-Century Women: Studies in Their Lives, Work, and Culture, vol. 1, ed. Linda V. Troost (New York: AMS Press, 2001).
 Aparna Gollapudi, 'Virtuous Voyages in Penelope Aubin's Fiction', SEL: Studies in English Literature 1500–1900 45:3 (Summer 2005), pp. 669–690
 Edward Kozaczka, "Penelope Aubin and Narratives of Empire," Eighteenth-Century Fiction, Volume 25, Number 1 (2012), pp. 199–226
 William H. McBurney, 'Mrs Penelope Aubin and the Early-Eighteenth Century English Novel', Huntington Library Quarterly, 20 (1956–7), pp. 245–267
 Chris Mounsey, ' '...bring her naked from her bed, that I may ravish her before the Dotard's face, and then send his Soul to Hell': Penelope Aubin, Impious Pietist, Humourist or Purveyor of Juvenile Fantasy?', British Journal for Eighteenth-Century Studies, 26 (2003), pp. 55–75
 C.M.Owen, 'The Virginal Individual', The Female Crusoe: hybridity, trade and the eighteenth-century female individual, Amsterdam: Rodopi Books, 2010: 139–164.
 Kulik, Maggie, 'What the Bookseller Did: a case of eighteenth-century plagiarism, The Female Spectator (2000).
 Sarah Prescott, 'Penelope Aubin and the Doctrine of Morality: a reassessment of the pious woman novelist', Women's Writing, Volume 1, No.1 (1994), pp. 99–112
 Debbie Welham, 'The Particular Case of Penelope Aubin', Journal for Eighteenth-Century Studies, Volume 31, Number 1 (2008), pp. 63–76
 Debbie Welham, "Delight and Instruction? Women's Political Engagement in the Works of Penelope Aubin," (PhD diss., University of Winchester, 2009).
Debbie Welham, "The Political Afterlife of Resentment in Penelope Aubin's The Life and Amorous Adventures of Lucinda (1721), Women's Writing, Volume 20, Number 1 (2013), pp. 49-63.
 Debbie Welham, "Penelope Aubin, Short Biography." (Chawton House).

References

External links
 Welham, Deborah, Delight and Instruction? Women's Political Engagement in the Works of Penelope Aubin, Literary biography and PhD thesis (2009), accessible free of charge through the British Library Ethos service https://ethos.bl.uk/OrderDetails.do?uin=uk.bl.ethos.515813
Joel H. Baer and Debbie Welham, ‘Aubin, Penelope (1679?–1738)’, Oxford Dictionary of National Biography, Oxford University Press, 2004, accessed 13 Nov 2006
 Penelope Aubin on Turkey
 Penelope Aubin in the Orlando Project
 Penelope Aubin in the OED

1679 births
1738 deaths
English women novelists
English translators
18th-century English women writers
18th-century English writers
18th-century English novelists
English women non-fiction writers